is a train station  in Kurume, Fukuoka.

Lines 
Nishi-Nippon Railroad
Tenjin Ōmuta Line

Platforms

Adjacent stations

Surrounding area
 Japan National Route 209
 St.Mary's Hospital
 Kurume Shikenjo Ekimae Post Office
 Kurume High School
 Kurume Substation (Kyushu Electric Power)
 Nishitetsu M-TECH Kurume Factory

Railway stations in Fukuoka Prefecture
Railway stations in Japan opened in 1932